Adam Patrick DeVine (born November 7, 1983) is an American actor, comedian, singer, screenwriter, and producer. He is one of the stars and co-creators of the Comedy Central comedy television series Workaholics and Adam DeVine's House Party.

He played the role of Bumper in the musical films Pitch Perfect and Pitch Perfect 2 and the television series Pitch Perfect: Bumper in Berlin. He had recurring sitcom roles as Andy Bailey in Modern Family and Adam DeMamp in Workaholics. He had roles in the films The Intern; The Final Girls; Mike and Dave Need Wedding Dates; Game Over, Man!; and When We First Met. He has voiced characters in films including Ice Age: Collision Course and The Lego Batman Movie, as well as in the animated series Uncle Grandpa, Penn Zero: Part-Time Hero, Vampirina, and Green Eggs and Ham.

Early life
Devine was born in Waterloo, Iowa, the son of Dennis and Penny Devine. He was raised in Omaha, Nebraska, and graduated from Millard South High School in 2002. He attended Orange Coast College, along with friend and future co-star Blake Anderson.

In June 1995 when he was 11, Devine was walking his bicycle across a road in Omaha. After he waited for three cement trucks to pass, a fourth truck, previously blocked by opposing traffic, struck him while he was in the street. He went under the first two wheels of the 42-ton truck and slid . He was knocked unconscious, suffered acute shock and fell into a coma. He was rushed to intensive care, where he woke up two weeks later. He had broken all the bones in both of his legs, had a collapsed lung, and developed multiple infections, and it was unknown whether he would walk again. Over several years, he had 26 surgeries and spent much of his time in a wheelchair. Due to the extent of his injuries, Devine was at very high risk of having to have his legs amputated, and having multiple organ failure. It was discovered that the reason he was not killed was that his bicycle took the full force of the truck. Devine regained full mobility but still has extensive scarring on his legs. He said of the accident, "It was really tough because I had to relearn how to walk, stand up, sit up and everything. The legs were totally mangled. I think that experience helped me realize that anything is possible." To pass the time, he would call into his local radio station and impersonate celebrities to entertain himself and others. Upon returning to school, he experienced bullying, but told jokes as a way to deflect attention away from his injuries. He later said that all of this contributed to how he saw comedy as a way of bringing people together.

Career
Devine moved to Los Angeles, where he began working as a stand-up comedian and actor. In 2006, Devine and friends Blake Anderson, Anders Holm, and Kyle Newacheck formed the sketch-comedy group Mail Order Comedy. Although they toured together live, they found greater success on websites such as Myspace and YouTube. In April 2008, the G4 series Attack of the Show! featured "Wizards Never Die", a music video by Mail Order Comedy (as The Wizards). Purple Magic, a music album by The Wizards containing 14 tracks, was released on April 1, 2009. Comedy Central's original series Workaholics premiered on April 6, 2011, and stars Devine, Anderson, and Holm and co-stars Newacheck, all of whom serve as series creators and executive producers.

Devine had small roles in Mama's Boy (2007) and National Lampoon's 301: The Legend of Awesomest Maximus (2009). He had a recurring role on the television series Samantha Who?. He appeared on an episode of the Fox show Traffic Light (2011). In season 4 of Community (2013), he played a small role as William Winger, Jr., Jeff's half-brother. In the first episode of Arrested Development fourth season, he played an airport ticket attendant alongside his Workaholics co-stars. He co-starred as Bumper Allen in the 2012 musical comedy film Pitch Perfect. For the performance, he won a Teen Choice Award for Choice Movie Villain and earned one nomination for Choice Movie Breakout. He reprised the role of Bumper in the film's sequel Pitch Perfect 2 (2015).

Devine has appeared in the SimCity video game trailers as The Mayor. Devine is the voice artist for the character Pizza Steve in the Cartoon Network animated series Uncle Grandpa, which premiered on September 2, 2013. He stars in his own Comedy Central series, Adam Devine's House Party, which debuted in October 2013. He appears in a recurring role in seasons 5, 6 and 7 of the ABC network sitcom Modern Family as Andy, the Pritchett family's nanny. In 2015, he performed in a supporting role, playing Kurt, in the slasher film The Final Girls. In 2016, he starred alongside Zac Efron, playing brothers, in the comedy film Mike and Dave Need Wedding Dates. Devine made a cameo appearance in the video for the 2016 Blink-182 song "She's Out of Her Mind".

In 2016, Devine was cast as the lead of Walt Disney Pictures family-film Magic Camp, alongside Jeffrey Tambor and Gillian Jacobs. Devine plays Andy Duckerman, a failed magician who goes back to the camp of his youth to mentor a rag-tag bunch of magicians. Principal photography began in January 2017 around Los Angeles. The film was released on August 14, 2020.

In 2018, Devine played the lead, Noah Ashby, in the romantic comedy When We First Met, which he co-wrote. That same year, Devine, Anderson, and Holm starred in the film Game Over, Man!, with Newacheck directing and Newacheck and Seth Rogen among its producers. On August 18, 2019, Devine debuted as Kelvin Gemstone in the HBO comedy television series The Righteous Gemstones. Created by Danny McBride, the series follows a dysfunctional world-famous family of televangelists. In September 2019, HBO renewed the series for a second season.

In 2019, Devine starred alongside Rebel Wilson and Liam Hemsworth in the romantic comedy/parody Isn't It Romantic. The film marked the fourth time that Devine and Wilson have played love interests, after Workaholics, Pitch Perfect and Pitch Perfect 2.

It was announced on July 13, 2019, at San Diego Comic-Con that Devine and Anderson would executive produce and provide voices for the animated adaptation of Gilbert Shelton's underground comic book The Fabulous Furry Freak Brothers.

On December 16, 2020, it was announced that Devine would be on The Price Is Right at Night that aired on January 13, 2021.

Personal life
Devine is a supporter of Children's Miracle Network Hospitals, a not-for-profit organization that raises funds for children's hospitals across the U.S. As he was treated by a children's hospital as a child, he attends charity events and visits the children, with his story of survival to provide comfort to the patients and their parents.

Devine regularly takes part in United Service Organizations tours, providing entertainment for military personnel across the world and describes it as "the most rewarding experience of his life".

After meeting on the set of The Final Girls in 2014, Devine began dating Chloe Bridges in February 2015. On October 24, 2019, Devine revealed via Instagram that he had become engaged to Bridges after four years of dating. The couple married on October 9, 2021.

Filmography

Film

Television

Music videos

References

External links
 
 

1983 births
Living people
American male comedians
American male film actors
American male television actors
American male voice actors
Orange Coast College alumni
Male actors from Omaha, Nebraska
Writers from Waterloo, Iowa
Writers from Omaha, Nebraska
21st-century American male actors
Male actors from Iowa
21st-century American comedians